The Logan Metropolitan Statistical Area, as defined by the United States Census Bureau, is an area consisting of two counties – one in Utah and one in Idaho, anchored by the city of Logan. As of the 2010 census, the MSA had a population of 125,442 (the Census Bureau estimate for July 1, 2014 placed the population at 131,364). The Logan metropolitan area is colloquially called Cache Valley, where most of the population resides.

Counties
Cache County, Utah
Franklin County, Idaho

Communities
Amalga, Utah
Avon, Utah (census-designated place)
Benson, Utah (census-designated place)
Cache Junction, Utah (census-designated place)
Clarkston, Utah
Clifton, Idaho
Cornish, Utah
Cove, Utah (census-designated place)
Dayton, Idaho
Franklin, Idaho
Hyde Park, Utah
Hyrum, Utah
Lewiston, Utah
Logan, Utah (Principal city)
Mendon, Utah
Millville, Utah
Newton, Utah
Nibley, Utah
North Logan, Utah
Oxford, Idaho
Paradise, Utah
Petersboro, Utah (census-designated place)
Preston, Idaho
Providence, Utah
Richmond, Utah
River Heights, Utah
Smithfield, Utah
Trenton, Utah
Wellsville, Utah
Weston, Idaho
Whitney, Idaho (unincorporated)

Demographics
As of the census of 2000, there were 102,720 people, 31,019 households, and 23,889 families residing within the MSA. The racial makeup of the MSA was 92.54% White, 0.35% African American, 0.55% Native American, 1.78% Asian, 0.18% Pacific Islander, 3.32% from other races, and 1.27% from two or more races. Hispanic or Latino of any race were 6.21% of the population.

The median income for a household in the MSA was $37,896, and the median income for a family was $42,319. Males had a median income of $31,234 versus $21,078 for females. The per capita income for the MSA was $14,398.

See also
Utah census statistical areas
Idaho census statistical areas

References

 
Metropolitan areas of Utah
Metropolitan areas of Idaho